"Når intet er godt nok" is a song performed by Danish pop, dance and R&B singer and songwriter Medina. It was released on 8 November 2014 as a digital download in Denmark. The song peaked at number 1 on the Danish Singles Chart.

An English version titled "Good Enough" was included on her English album, We Survive (2016).

Music video
A music video to accompany the release of "Når Intet Er Godt Nok" was first released onto YouTube on 30 November 2014 at a total length of three minutes and forty-nine seconds.

Track listing

Chart performance

Weekly charts

Release history

References

2014 singles
Universal Music Group singles
2014 songs
Number-one singles in Denmark
Songs written by Medina (singer)
Medina (singer) songs